José Salomón Nazar Ordóñez (born 7 August 1952) is a retired Honduran football goalkeeper who played for Honduras in the 1982 FIFA World Cup.

Club career
Nicknamed Turco, Nazar played the majority of his career for Pumas UNAH, but also had two short spells at Club Deportivo Olimpia and F.C. Motagua.

International career
Nazar represented Honduras in 1 FIFA World Cup qualification match and was a non-playing squad member at the 1982 World Cup.

Administration
Nazar was secretary at Universidad during the 2000s. He was in charge of second tier UPNFM during the 2011 Clausura.

References

1953 births
Living people
Association football goalkeepers
Honduran footballers
Honduras international footballers
1982 FIFA World Cup players
C.D. Olimpia players
F.C. Motagua players
Honduran football managers
Honduran people of Arab descent